Guachinango   is a town and municipality, in Jalisco in central-western Mexico. The municipality covers an area of 483.19 km².

As of 2005, the municipality had a total population of 4,138.

The Spanish discovered gold lodes here in the 1540s, which started commercial gold mining in the area.

References

Municipalities of Jalisco